Nationality words link to articles with information on the nation's poetry or literature (for instance, Irish or France).

Events

Works published
 John Skelton, Colin Clout, publication year uncertain
 First translation into French of  Les Triomphes ("Triumphs") of Petrarch
 Marguerite de Navarre, Le Miroir de l'ame Pecheresse, long devotional poem

Births
Death years link to the corresponding "[year] in poetry" article:
 Ercole Bottrigari (died 1612), Italian scholar, mathematician, poet, music theorist, architect, and composer

Deaths
Birth years link to the corresponding "[year] in poetry" article:
 October 11 - Huldrych Zwingli (born 1484), Swiss theologian, priest, poet and writer, killed in Second War of Kappel

See also

 Poetry
 16th century in poetry
 16th century in literature
 French Renaissance literature
 Renaissance literature
 Spanish Renaissance literature

Notes

16th-century poetry
Poetry